Kesawai is a Rai Coast language spoken in Madang Province, Papua New Guinea.

References

References

 
 	

Rai Coast languages
Languages of Madang Province